Darwin Township is a township in Meeker County, Minnesota, United States. The population was 713 at the 2000 census. The township includes the city of Darwin plus a small eastern portion of the city of Litchfield.

Darwin Township was organized in 1858, and named for E. Darwin Litchfield, a railroad official.

Geography

Darwin Township is located in Township 119 North of the Arkansas Base Line and Range 30 West of the 5th Principal Meridian.

Demographics
As of the census of 2000, there were 713 people, 281 households, and 218 families residing in the township.  The population density was 22.0 people per square mile (8.5/km2).  There were 382 housing units at an average density of 11.8/sq mi (4.6/km2).  The racial makeup of the township was 97.76% White, 0.28% Native American, 0.14% Asian, 1.26% from other races, and 0.56% from two or more races. Hispanic or Latino of any race were 1.54% of the population.

There were 281 households, out of which 29.9% had children under the age of 18 living with them, 68.3% were married couples living together, 6.0% had a female householder with no husband present, and 22.1% were non-families. 17.8% of all households were made up of individuals, and 8.5% had someone living alone who was 65 years of age or older.  The average household size was 2.54 and the average family size was 2.79.

In the township the population was spread out, with 21.9% under the age of 18, 6.3% from 18 to 24, 25.2% from 25 to 44, 28.1% from 45 to 64, and 18.5% who were 65 years of age or older.  The median age was 43 years. For every 100 females, there were 100.3 males.  For every 100 females age 18 and over, there were 105.5 males.

The median income for a household in the township was $41,818, and the median income for a family was $43,594. Males had a median income of $36,406 versus $25,000 for females. The per capita income for the township was $20,763.  About 5.0% of families and 6.8% of the population were below the poverty line, including 7.6% of those under age 18 and 10.2% of those age 65 or over.

References

Townships in Meeker County, Minnesota
Townships in Minnesota
Populated places established in 1858
1858 establishments in Minnesota